Bolshaya Oka (Olo Aqa) is a rural locality (a selo) and the administrative centre of Bolsheokinsky Selsoviet, Mechetlinsky District, Bashkortostan, Russia. The population was 1,064 as of 2010. There are 6 streets.

Geography 
Bolshaya Oka is located 17 km north of Bolsheustyikinskoye (the district's administrative centre) by road. Srednyaya Oka is the nearest rural locality.

References 

Rural localities in Mechetlinsky District